Atal or ATAL may refer to:

Atal, Astrakhan Oblast, Russia
Atal Tunnel, a road tunnel being constructed in Himachal Pradesh, India
As Tall as Lions, an American musical group
As Tall as Lions (album), their 2006 album
Technological and Logistics Directorate, of the Israel Defense Forces
Atal, a character of the Cthulhu Mythos

People with the given name
 Atal Bihari Vajpayee (1924–2018), Prime Minister of India
 Atal Bihari Panda, Indian actor

People with surname 
 Bakhtarullah Atal, Afghan cricketer
 Bishnu S. Atal (born 1933), Indian-American researcher
 Hira Lal Atal (1905–1985), Indian general
 Yogesh Atal (1937–2018), Indian sociologist
 Youcef Atal (born 1996), Algerian footballer

See also

Attal, a surname
Antal (given name)
Antal (surname)